Göte Wahlström (born 1951) is a Swedish politician and former member of the Riksdag, the national legislature. A member of the Social Democratic Party, he represented Jönköping County between October 1998 and October 2010.

References

1951 births
Living people
Members of the Riksdag 1998–2002
Members of the Riksdag 2002–2006
Members of the Riksdag 2006–2010
Members of the Riksdag from the Social Democrats